Takorn Tantasith is the first and current Secretary-General of the National Broadcasting and Telecommunications Commission (NBTC), Thailand. Being Secretary-General, he holds the highest executive position at the Office of the NBTC, having roles and responsibilities as stipulated by the Act on Organization to Assign Radio Frequency and to Regulate the Broadcasting and Telecommunications Services B.E. 2553 (2010). Takorn was appointed Secretary-General of the NBTC on 5 January 2012, for a five-year term, and in late 2016 was reappointed for a second term starting 5 January 2017. Prior to this, he was Acting Secretary-General of the NBTC, and Secretary-General of the National Telecommunications Commission (NTC).

One of the accomplishments of Takorn as Secretary-General of the NBTC is the two spectrum auctions organized by the Office of the NBTC in 2015. The first auction, held in November for the 1800 MHz spectrum, concluded after an unprecedented two-day bidding battle and generated more than 80 billion baht in public revenue. The second auction, held a month later for the 900 MHz spectrum, lasted over four days with the final revenue reaching over 150 billion baht. Earlier in 2015, Takorn also spearheaded a nationwide campaign to register all mobile SIM cards in Thailand, and ordered a temporary suspension of Thai TV’s licence following the channel's non-payment of its digital television licence fees.

Following a great achievement in 2015 that unleashed 4G mobile internet and transformed Thai economy landscape, the Office of NBTC under Takorn's leadership organized auctions in 2018 for the expiring 1800 MHz and 900 MHz spectrum bands which generated a total revenue of 50 billion baht. In 2019, the Office of NBTC held an auction for 700 MHz in advance to prepare Thailand for 5G era. The total revenue earned was 56 billion baht this time. For 2020, under his direction, the Office of NBTC plans to release 5G spectrum in these following bands: 700 MHz, 1800 MHz, 2600 MHz and 26 GHz to the private sector in February.

Early life and education

Takorn was born on 10 September 1960. He graduated with a Bachelor of Laws (Second-Class Honors) from Ramkhamhaeng University, Thailand, in 1982, and a master's degree in Public Administration from Detroit University, United States, in 1986. In 2013, Takorn received an honorary doctorate in Public Administration from Prince of Songkla University, Thailand. He was also awarded a "Technology Person of the Year" in 2015 by Foundation of Science and Technology of Thailand in 2015, an honorary degree for doctor of philosophy by Srinakharinwirot University in 2017, and Human Resource Excellence Award presented by Thammasat University in 2017.

Personal life 

Takorn is married to Pornpanee Tantasith. Pornpanee holds a bachelor's degree from the Faculty of Arts at Chulalongkorn University, Thailand, and a Master of Arts in Applied Linguistics (Teaching English as a Second Language) from the University of South Florida, United States, and is currently a lecturer at Assumption University (ABAC), Thailand.

Takorn and Pornpanee have two sons, Chantawit and Kritti, and one daughter, Isaree. A former scholarship student of the Bank of Thailand, Chantawit graduated from the London School of Economics and is taking a study leave from his position at Bank of Thailand to pursue a master in public policy at Harvard University. Isaree received a scholarship from the Office of the NBTC and graduated with a Bachelor of Arts in Law from Magdalene College, University of Cambridge, United Kingdom and holds a Master of Laws (LLM) from the Australian National University (ANU), Australia and graduated from the Thai Barrister Association. She is currently serving as a Judge at Court of Justice. Kritti is a recipient of the Thai government scholarship and completed a bachelor degree in public policy from London School of Economics. He is currently working at Ministry of Social Development and Human Security and studying for a master's degree at Thammasat University.

Career 

 5 January 2017 to Present: Secretary-General of the NBTC (second term)
 5 January 2012 to 4 January 2017: Secretary-General of the NBTC
 20 December 2010 to 4 January 2012: Acting Secretary-General of the NBTC
 1 December 2009 to 19 December 2010: Acting Secretary-General of the National Telecommunications Commission (NTC)
 2006-2009: Deputy Secretary-General of the NTC
 2005-2006: Principal Expert, Office of the NTC
 2005: Advisor to the Chairman of the State Audit Commission, Office of the Auditor General of Thailand
 1987-2004: Budget Analyst, Bureau of the Budget

Other Notable Roles - Current 
 Member, Digital Economy Fund Committee
 Member and Counselor to the Digital Economy Committee
 Member, National Safe and Creative Media Commission
 Board Member and Secretary, Broadcasting and Telecommunications Research and Development Fund for the Public Interest
 Member and Counselor to the Public Relations for the National Unity Commission.
 Member, National ICT Security Master Plan Drafting Committee
 Member, Emergency Medicine and Disaster Communications Strategy Committee
 Member, National Intellectual Property Policy Commission
 Member, National Cybersecurity Committee
 Member, Committee to Prevent and Curb Defamatory Websites, Royal Thai Police

Other Notable Roles - Past 
 Public Relations Vice-Chairman, Committee to Organize the Celebration of the 150th Anniversary of the Birth of Her Majesty Queen Srisavarindira, the Queen Grandmother of Thailand 
 Member, Committee to set up the Institute of Technology to Drive ICT Policy for Education Reform
 Vice-Chairman, Technology for Education Development Fund, Office of the Permanent Secretary, Ministry of Education
 Advisor to the Senate Committee on Communications
 Member, Senate Subcommittee on Land Transport
 Member, Subcommittee to compile and document the works of the Senate Committee on Communications
 Secretary, Senate Committee on Communications, 2000-2001
 Expert, Senate Committee on Communications, 2002-2003
 Board Member, Zoological Park Organization under the Royal Patronage of H.M. the King
 Board Member, Forest Industry Organization
 Member and Secretary, Broadcasting Subcommittee
 Advisory Member, University Council, Kalasin Rajabhat University

Notable Executive Training Participation 

 E-Government Executive Education, 1st Class, 2013
 Broadcasting Executive Forum, 1st Class, 2013
 Energy Innovation Executive Education, 1st Class, Thailand Energy Academy, 2012
 The Country's Pillars: Executives in King Rama IX's Vision, 1st Class, 2012
 National Defence College of Thailand, 23rd Class, 2010
 Judicial Process Executive Education, 14th Class, Judicial Training Institute, Courts of Justice, 2009
 Capital Market Academy Executive Education, 8th Class, 2008
 Civil Service Development Program, 50th Class, Office of the Civil Service Commission, 2006
 Advanced Public Administration and Public Law Executive Education, 4th Class, King Prajadhipok's Institute, 2005
 New Wave of Leaders in the Thai Civil Service, 1st Class, 2000

Royal Decorations & Awards 

Takorn has received the following royal decorations in the Honours System of Thailand:
 2013 Knight Grand Cordon (Special Class) of the Most Exalted Order of the White Elephant
 2010 Knight Grand Cordon (Special Class) of the Most Noble Order of the Crown of Thailand
 2003 Knight Commander (Second Class) of the Most Exalted Order of the White Elephant
 1999 Knight Commander (Second Class) of the Most Noble Order of the Crown of Thailand
Takorn has received the following awards.
 2017 Honorary Degree for a Doctor of Philosophy by Srinakharinwirot University
 2017 Human Resource Excellence Award presented by Thammasat University
 2015 Quality Person of the Year Award in the Technology category by the Foundation of Science and Technology Council of Thailand.

References 

Living people
1960 births
Takorn Tantasith